Gintaras Staškevičius (born 26 February 1964) is a Lithuanian modern pentathlete. He competed at the 1992 Summer Olympics.

References

1964 births
Living people
Soviet male modern pentathletes
Lithuanian male modern pentathletes
Olympic modern pentathletes of Lithuania
Modern pentathletes at the 1992 Summer Olympics
Sportspeople from Vilnius